Jiddu Krishnamurti (11 May 1895 – 17 February 1986) was a philosopher, speaker and writer. In his early life, he was groomed to be the new World Teacher, an advanced spiritual position in the theosophical tradition, but later rejected this mantle and withdrew from the organization behind it. His interests included psychological revolution, the nature of mind, meditation, holistic inquiry, human relationships, and bringing about radical change in society. He stressed the need for a revolution in the psyche of every human being and emphasised that such revolution cannot be brought about by any external entity, be it religious, political, or social.

Krishnamurti was born in South India, in what is now the modern-day Madanapalle of Andhra Pradesh. In early adolescence, he met occultist and theosophist Charles Webster Leadbeater on the grounds of the Theosophical Society headquarters at Adyar in Madras. He was subsequently raised under the tutelage of Annie Besant and Leadbeater, leaders of the Society at the time, who believed him to be a 'vehicle' for an expected World Teacher. As a young man, he disavowed this idea and dissolved the Order of the Star in the East, an organisation that had been established to support it.

Krishnamurti said he had no allegiance to any nationality, caste, religion, or philosophy, and spent the rest of his life travelling the world, speaking to large and small groups, as well as individuals. He wrote many books, among them The First and Last Freedom, The Only Revolution, and Krishnamurti's Notebook. Many of his talks and discussions have been published. His last public talk was in Madras (now known as Chennai), India, in January 1986, a month before his death at his home in Ojai, California. His supporters — working through non-profit foundations in India, Britain, and the United States — oversee several independent schools based on his views on education. They continue to transcribe and distribute his thousands of talks, group and individual discussions, and writings by use of a variety of media formats and languages.

Biography

Family background and childhood

The date of birth of Krishnamurti is a matter of dispute. Mary Lutyens determines it to be 11 May 1895, but Christine Williams notes the unreliability of birth registrations in that period and that statements claiming dates ranging from 4 May 1895 to 25 May 1896 exist. He used calculations based on a published horoscope to derive a date of 11 May 1895 but "retains a measure of scepticism" about it. His birthplace was the small town of Madanapalle in Madras Presidency ( Chittoor District in Andhra Pradesh). He was born in a Telugu-speaking Brahmin family. His father, Jiddu Narayanaiah, was employed as an official of the British colonial administration. Krishnamurti was fond of his mother Sanjeevamma, who died when he was ten. His parents had a total of eleven children, of whom six survived childhood.

In 1903 the family settled in Cudappah, where Krishnamurti had contracted malaria during a previous stay. He suffered recurrent bouts of the disease over many years. A sensitive and sickly child, "vague and dreamy", he was often taken to be intellectually disabled, and was beaten regularly at school by his teachers and at home by his father. In memoirs written when he was eighteen years old Krishnamurti described psychic experiences, such as seeing his sister, who had died in 1904, and his late mother. During his childhood he developed a bond with nature that was to stay with him for the rest of his life.

Krishnamurti's father retired at the end of 1907. He sought employment at the headquarters of the Theosophical Society at Adyar. Narayanaiah had been a Theosophist since 1882. He was eventually hired by the Society as a clerk, moving there with his family in January 1909. Narayanaiah and his sons were at first assigned to live in a small cottage that was located just outside the society's compound.

Discovered
In April 1909, Krishnamurti first met Charles Webster Leadbeater, who claimed clairvoyance. Leadbeater had noticed Krishnamurti on the Society's beach on the Adyar river, and was amazed by the "most wonderful aura he had ever seen, without a particle of selfishness in it." Ernest Wood, an adjutant of Leadbeater's at the time, who helped Krishnamurti with his homework, considered him to be "particularly dim-witted". Leadbeater was convinced that the boy would become a spiritual teacher and a great orator; the likely "vehicle for the Lord Maitreya" in Theosophical doctrine, an advanced spiritual entity periodically appearing on Earth as a World Teacher to guide the evolution of humankind.

In her biography of Krishnamurti, Pupul Jayakar quotes him speaking of that period in his life some 75 years later: "The boy had always said "I will do whatever you want". There was an element of subservience, obedience. The boy was vague, uncertain, woolly; he didn't seem to care what was happening. He was like a vessel with a large hole in it, whatever was put in, went through, nothing remained."

Following his discovery by Leadbeater, Krishnamurti was nurtured by the Theosophical Society in Adyar. Leadbeater and a small number of trusted associates undertook the task of educating, protecting, and generally preparing Krishnamurti as the "vehicle" of the expected World Teacher. Krishnamurti (often later called Krishnaji) and his younger brother Nityananda (Nitya) were privately tutored at the Theosophical compound in Madras, and later exposed to an opulent life among a segment of European high society as they continued their education abroad. Despite his history of problems with schoolwork and concerns about his capacities and physical condition, the 14-year-old Krishnamurti was able to speak and write competently in English within six months. Lutyens says that later in life Krishnamurti came to view his "discovery" as a life-saving event. When he was asked in later life what he thought would have happened to him if he had not been 'discovered' by Leadbeater he unhesitatingly replied "I would have died".

During this time Krishnamurti had developed a strong bond with Annie Besant and came to view her as a surrogate mother. His father, who had initially assented to Besant's legal guardianship of Krishnamurti, was pushed into the background by the swirl of attention around his son. In 1912 he sued Besant to annul the guardianship agreement. After a protracted legal battle, Besant took custody of Krishnamurti and Nitya. As a result of this separation from family and home Krishnamurti and his brother (whose relationship had always been very close) became more dependent on each other, and in the following years often travelled together.

In 1911 the Theosophical Society established the Order of the Star in the East (OSE) to prepare the world for the expected appearance of the World Teacher. Krishnamurti was named as its head, with senior Theosophists assigned various other positions. Membership was open to anybody who accepted the doctrine of the Coming of the World Teacher. Controversy soon erupted, both within the Theosophical Society and outside it, in Hindu circles and the Indian press.

Growing up
Mary Lutyens, a biographer, says that there was a time when Krishnamurti believed that he was to become the World Teacher after correct spiritual and secular guidance and education. Another biographer describes the daily program imposed on him by Leadbeater and his associates, which included rigorous exercise and sports, tutoring in a variety of school subjects, Theosophical and religious lessons, yoga and meditation, as well as instruction in proper hygiene and in the ways of British society and culture. At the same time Leadbeater assumed the role of guide in a parallel mystical instruction of Krishnamurti; the existence and progress of this instruction was at the time known only to a select few.

While he showed a natural aptitude in sports, Krishnamurti always had problems with formal schooling and was not academically inclined. He eventually gave up university education after several attempts at admission. He did take to foreign languages, in time speaking several with some fluency.

His public image, cultivated by the Theosophists, "was to be characterized by a well-polished exterior, a sobriety of purpose, a cosmopolitan outlook and an otherworldly, almost beatific detachment in his demeanor." Demonstrably, "all of these can be said to have characterized Krishnamurti's public image to the end of his life." It was apparently clear early on that he "possessed an innate personal magnetism, not of a warm physical variety, but nonetheless emotive in its austerity, and inclined to inspire veneration." However, as he was growing up, Krishnamurti showed signs of adolescent rebellion and emotional instability, chafing at the regimen imposed on him, visibly uncomfortable with the publicity surrounding him, and occasionally expressing doubts about the future prescribed for him.

Krishnamurti and Nitya were taken to England in April 1911. During this trip Krishnamurti gave his first public speech to members of the OSE in London. His first writings had also started to appear, published in booklets by the Theosophical Society and in Theosophical and OSE-affiliated magazines. Between 1911 and the start of World War I in 1914, the brothers visited several other European countries, always accompanied by Theosophist chaperones. Meanwhile, Krishnamurti had for the first time acquired a measure of personal financial independence, thanks to a wealthy benefactress, American Mary Melissa Hoadley Dodge, who was domiciled in England.

After the war, Krishnamurti embarked on a series of lectures, meetings and discussions around the world, related to his duties as the Head of the OSE, accompanied by Nitya, by then the Organizing Secretary of the Order. Krishnamurti also continued writing. The content of his talks and writings revolved around the work of the Order and of its members in preparation for the Coming. He was initially described as a halting, hesitant, and repetitive speaker, but his delivery and confidence improved, and he gradually took command of the meetings.

In 1921 Krishnamurti fell in love with Helen Knothe, a 17-year-old American whose family associated with the Theosophists. The experience was tempered by the realisation that his work and expected life-mission precluded what would otherwise be considered normal relationships and by the mid-1920s the two of them had drifted apart.

Life-altering experiences
In 1922 Krishnamurti and Nitya travelled from Sydney to California. In California, they stayed at a cottage in the Ojai Valley. It was thought that the area's climate would be beneficial to Nitya, who had been diagnosed with tuberculosis. Nitya's failing health became a concern for Krishnamurti. At Ojai they met Rosalind Williams, a young American who became close to them both, and who was later to play a significant role in Krishnamurti's life. For the first time the brothers were without immediate supervision by their Theosophical Society minders. They found the Valley to be very agreeable. Eventually, a trust, formed by supporters, bought a cottage and surrounding property there for them. This became Krishnamurti's official residence.

At Ojai in August and September 1922, Krishnamurti went through an intense 'life-changing' experience. This has been variously characterised as a spiritual awakening, a psychological transformation, and a physical reconditioning. The initial events happened in two distinct phases: first a three-day spiritual experience, and two weeks later, a longer-lasting condition that Krishnamurti and those around him referred to as the process. This condition recurred, at frequent intervals and with varying intensity, until his death.

According to witnesses, it started on 17 August 1922 when Krishnamurti complained of a sharp pain at the nape of his neck. Over the next two days the symptoms worsened, with increasing pain and sensitivity, loss of appetite, and occasional delirious ramblings. He seemed to lapse into unconsciousness but later recounted that he was very much aware of his surroundings, and that while in that state he had an experience of "mystical union". The following day the symptoms and the experience intensified, climaxing with a sense of "immense peace". Following — and apparently related to — these events the condition that came to be known as the process started to affect him, in September and October that year, as a regular, almost nightly occurrence. Later the process resumed intermittently, with varying degrees of pain, physical discomfort, and sensitivity, occasionally a lapse into a childlike state, and sometimes an apparent fading out of consciousness, explained as either his body giving in to pain or his mind "going off".

These experiences were accompanied or followed by what was interchangeably described as, "the benediction," "the immensity," "the sacredness," "the vastness" and, most often, "the otherness" or "the other." It was a state distinct from the process. According to Lutyens it is evident from his notebook that this experience of otherness was "with him almost continuously" during his life, and gave him "a sense of being protected." Krishnamurti describes it in his notebook as typically following an acute experience of the process, for example, on awakening the next day:

This experience of the otherness was present with him in daily events:

Since the initial occurrences of 1922, several explanations have been proposed for this experience of Krishnamurti's. Leadbeater and other Theosophists expected the "vehicle" to have certain paranormal experiences but were nevertheless mystified by these developments. During Krishnamurti's later years, the nature and provenance of the continuing process often came up as a subject in private discussions between himself and associates; these discussions shed some light on the subject but were ultimately inconclusive. Whatever the case, the process, and the inability of Leadbeater to explain it satisfactorily, if at all, had other consequences according to biographer Roland Vernon:

As news of these mystical experiences spread, rumours concerning the messianic status of Krishnamurti reached fever pitch as the 1925 Theosophical Society Convention was planned, on the 50th anniversary of its founding. There were expectations of significant happenings. Paralleling the increasing adulation was Krishnamurti's growing discomfort with it. In related developments, prominent Theosophists and their factions within the Society were trying to position themselves favourably relative to the Coming, which was widely rumoured to be approaching. He stated that "Too much of everything is bad". "Extraordinary" pronouncements of spiritual advancement were made by various parties, disputed by others, and the internal Theosophical politics further alienated Krishnamurti.

Nitya's persistent health problems had periodically resurfaced throughout this time. On 13 November 1925, at age 27, he died in Ojai from complications of influenza and tuberculosis. Despite Nitya's poor health, his death was unexpected, and it fundamentally shook Krishnamurti's belief in Theosophy and in the leaders of the Theosophical Society. He had received their assurances regarding Nitya's health, and had come to believe that "Nitya was essential for [his] life-mission and therefore he would not be allowed to die," a belief shared by Annie Besant and Krishnamurti's circle. Jayakar wrote that "his belief in the Masters and the hierarchy had undergone a total revolution." Moreover, Nitya had been the "last surviving link to his family and childhood. ... The only person to whom he could talk openly, his best friend and companion." According to eyewitness accounts, the news "broke him completely." but 12 days after Nitya's death he was "immensely quiet, radiant, and free of all sentiment and emotion"; "there was not a shadow ... to show what he had been through."

Break with the past
Over the next few years, Krishnamurti's new vision and consciousness continued to develop. New concepts appeared in his talks, discussions, and correspondence, together with an evolving vocabulary that was progressively free of Theosophical terminology. His new direction reached a climax in 1929, when he rebuffed attempts by Leadbeater and Besant to continue with the Order of the Star.

Krishnamurti dissolved the Order during the annual Star Camp at Ommen, the Netherlands, on 3 August 1929. He stated that he had made his decision after "careful consideration" during the previous two years, and that:

Following the dissolution, prominent Theosophists turned against Krishnamurti, including Leadbeater who is said to have stated, "the Coming had gone wrong." Krishnamurti had denounced all organised belief, the notion of gurus, and the whole teacher-follower relationship, vowing instead to work on setting people "absolutely, unconditionally free." There is no record of his explicitly denying he was the World Teacher; whenever he was asked to clarify his position he either asserted that the matter was irrelevant or gave answers that, as he stated, were "purposely vague."

In hind-sight it can be seen that the ongoing changes in his outlook had begun before the dissolution of the Order of the Star. The subtlety of the new distinctions on the World Teacher issue was lost on many of his admirers, who were already bewildered or distraught because of the changes in Krishnamurti's outlook, vocabulary and pronouncements–among them Besant and Mary Lutyens' mother Emily, who had a very close relationship with him. He soon disassociated himself from the Theosophical Society and its teachings and practices, yet he remained on cordial terms with some of its members and ex-members throughout his life.

Krishnamurti often referred to the totality of his work as the teachings and not as my teachings.

Krishnamurti resigned from the various trusts and other organisations that were affiliated with the defunct Order of the Star, including the Theosophical Society.

Middle years
From 1930 through 1944 Krishnamurti engaged in speaking tours and in the issue of publications under the auspice of the "Star Publishing Trust" (SPT), which he had founded with Desikacharya Rajagopal, a close associate and friend from the Order of the Star. Ojai was the base of operations for the new enterprise, where Krishnamurti, Rajagopal, and Rosalind Williams (who had married Rajagopal in 1927) resided in the house known as Arya Vihara (meaning Realm of the Aryas, i.e. those noble by righteousness in Sanskrit). The business and organizational aspects of the SPT were administered chiefly by D. Rajagopal, as Krishnamurti devoted his time to speaking and meditation. The Rajagopals' marriage was not a happy one, and the two became physically estranged after the 1931 birth of their daughter, Radha.  Krishnamurti's friendship with Rosalind became a love affair. According to Radha Rajagopal Sloss, the affair between Krishnamurti and Rosalind began in 1932 and it endured for about twenty-five years. Radha Sloss, daughter of Rajagopal, wrote about the affair in her book Lives in the Shadow with J. Krishnamurti.

During the 1930s Krishnamurti spoke in Europe, Latin America, India, Australia and the United States. In 1938 he met Aldous Huxley. The two began a close friendship which endured for many years. They held common concerns about the imminent conflict in Europe which they viewed as the outcome of the pernicious influence of nationalism. Krishnamurti's stance on World War II was often construed as pacifism and even subversion during a time of patriotic fervor in the United States and for a time he came under the surveillance of the FBI. He did not speak publicly for a period of about four years (between 1940 and 1944). During this time he lived and worked at Arya Vihara, which during the war operated as a largely self-sustaining farm, with its surplus goods donated for relief efforts in Europe. Of the years spent in Ojai during the war he later said: "I think it was a period of no challenge, no demand, no outgoing. I think it was a kind of everything held in; and when I left Ojai it all burst."

Krishnamurti broke the hiatus from public speaking in May 1944 with a series of talks in Ojai. These talks, and subsequent material, were published by "Krishnamurti Writings Inc." (KWINC), the successor organisation to the "Star Publishing Trust." This was to be the new central Krishnamurti-related entity worldwide, whose sole purpose was the dissemination of the teaching. He had remained in contact with associates from India, and in the autumn of 1947 embarked on a speaking tour there, attracting a new following of young intellectuals. On this trip he encountered the Mehta sisters, Pupul and Nandini, who became lifelong associates and confidants. The sisters also attended to Krishnamurti throughout a 1948 recurrence of the "process" in Ootacamund. In Poona in 1948, Krishnamurti met Iyengar, who taught him Yoga practices every morning for the next three months, then on and off for twenty years.

When Krishnamurti was in India after World War II many prominent personalities came to meet him, including Prime Minister Jawaharlal Nehru. In his meetings with Nehru, Krishnamurti elaborated at length on the teachings, saying in one instance, "Understanding of the self only arises in relationship, in watching yourself in relationship to people, ideas, and things; to trees, the earth, and the world around you and within you. Relationship is the mirror in which the self is revealed. Without self-knowledge there is no basis for right thought and action." Nehru asked, "How does one start?" to which Krishnamurti replied, "Begin where you are. Read every word, every phrase, every paragraph of the mind, as it operates through thought."

Later years
Krishnamurti continued speaking in public lectures, group discussions and with concerned individuals around the world. In the early 1960s, he made the acquaintance of physicist David Bohm, whose philosophical and scientific concerns regarding the essence of the physical world, and the psychological and sociological state of mankind, found parallels in Krishnamurti's philosophy. The two men soon became close friends and started a common inquiry, in the form of personal dialogues–and occasionally in group discussions with other participants–that continued, periodically, over nearly two decades. Several of these discussions were published in the form of books or as parts of books, and introduced a wider audience (among scientists) to Krishnamurti's ideas. Although Krishnamurti's philosophy delved into fields as diverse as religious studies, education, psychology, physics, and consciousness studies, he was not then, nor since, well known in academic circles. Nevertheless, Krishnamurti met and held discussions with physicists Fritjof Capra and E. C. George Sudarshan, biologist Rupert Sheldrake, psychiatrist David Shainberg, as well as psychotherapists representing various theoretical orientations. The long friendship with Bohm went through a rocky interval in later years, and although they overcame their differences and remained friends until Krishnamurti's death, the relationship did not regain its previous intensity.

In the 1970s, Krishnamurti met several times with then Indian prime minister Indira Gandhi, with whom he had far-ranging, and in some cases, very serious conversations. Jayakar considers his message in meetings with Indira Gandhi as a possible influence in the lifting of certain emergency measures Gandhi had imposed during periods of political turmoil.

Meanwhile, Krishnamurti's once close relationship with the Rajagopals had deteriorated to the point where he took D. Rajagopal to court to recover donated property and funds as well as publication rights for his works, manuscripts, and personal correspondence, that were in Rajagopal's possession. The litigation and ensuing cross complaints, which formally began in 1971, continued for many years. Much property and materials were returned to Krishnamurti during his lifetime; the parties to this case finally settled all other matters in 1986, shortly after his death.

In 1984 and 1985, Krishnamurti spoke to an invited audience at the United Nations in New York, under the auspices of the Pacem in Terris Society chapter at the United Nations. In October 1985, he visited India for the last time, holding a number of what came to be known as "farewell" talks and discussions between then and January 1986. These last talks included the fundamental questions he had been asking through the years, as well as newer concerns about advances in science and technology, and their effect on humankind. Krishnamurti had commented to friends that he did not wish to invite death, but was not sure how long his body would last (he had already lost considerable weight), and once he could no longer talk, he would have "no further purpose". In his final talk, on 4 January 1986, in Madras, he again invited the audience to examine with him the nature of inquiry, the effect of technology, the nature of life and meditation, and the nature of creation.

Krishnamurti was also concerned about his legacy, about being unwittingly turned into some personage whose teachings had been handed down to special individuals, rather than the world at large. He did not want anybody to pose as an interpreter of the teaching. He warned his associates on several occasions that they were not to present themselves as spokesmen on his behalf, or as his successors after his death.

A few days before his death, in a final statement, he declared that nobody among either his associates or the general public had understood what had happened to him (as the conduit of the teaching). He added that the "supreme intelligence" operating in his body would be gone with his death, again implying the impossibility of successors. However, he stated that people could perhaps get into touch with that somewhat "if they live the teachings". In prior discussions, he had compared himself with Thomas Edison, implying that he did the hard work, and now all that was needed by others was a flick of the switch.

Death
Krishnamurti died of pancreatic cancer on 17 February 1986, at the age of 90. The announcement of KFT (Krishnamurti Foundation Trust) refers to the course of his health condition until the moment of death. The first signs came almost nine months before his death, when he felt very tired. In October 1985, he went from England (Brockwood Park School) to India and after that, he suffered from exhaustion, fevers, and lost weight. Krishnamurti decided to go back to Ojai (10 January 1986) after his last talks in Madras, which necessitated a 24-hour flight. Once he arrived at Ojai he underwent medical tests that revealed he was suffering from pancreatic cancer. The cancer was untreatable, either surgically or otherwise, so Krishnamurti decided to go back to his home at Ojai, where he spent his last days. Friends and professionals nursed him. His mind was clear until the last moment. Krishnamurti died on 17 February 1986, at 10 minutes past midnight, California time. In accordance with his wishes, no memorial service was conducted. His ashes were divided into three parts: for Ojai, India and England. In India they were immersed in River Ganga in Varanasi, Gangotri, and in the ocean Adayar beach.

Schools

Krishnamurti founded five schools in India, one in England, Brockwood Park School, and one in California, Oak Grove School. When asked, he enumerated the following as his educational aims:
Global outlook: A vision of the whole as distinct from the part; there should never be a sectarian outlook, but always a holistic outlook free from all prejudice.
Concern for man and the environment: Humanity is part of nature, and if nature is not cared for, it will boomerang on man. Only the right education, and deep affection between people everywhere, will resolve many problems including the environmental challenges.
Religious spirit, which includes the scientific temper: The religious mind is alone, not lonely. It is in communion with people and nature.

The Krishnamurti Foundation, established in 1928 by him and Annie Besant, manages six schools in India and abroad.

Influence

Krishnamurti attracted the interest of the mainstream religious establishment in India. He engaged in discussions with several well known Hindu and Buddhist scholars and leaders, including the Dalai Lama. Several of these discussions were later published as chapters in various Krishnamurti books. Notable individuals influenced by Krishnamurti include George Bernard Shaw, David Bohm, Jawaharlal Nehru, Dalai Lama, Aldous Huxley, Alan Watts, Henry Miller, Bruce Lee, Terence Stamp, Jackson Pollock, Toni Packer, Achyut Patwardhan, Dada Dharmadhikari and Eckhart Tolle.

Interest in Krishnamurti and his work has persisted in the years since his death. Many books, audio, video, and computer materials, remain in print and are carried by major online and traditional retailers. The four official Foundations continue to maintain archives, disseminate the teachings in an increasing number of languages, convert print to digital and other media, develop websites, sponsor television programs, and organise meetings and dialogues of interested persons around the world.

In popular culture 
A sample of Krishnamurti's 1980 talk "Why Does The Mind Constantly Seek Pleasure" appears in the Tube & Berger song Imprint of Pleasure.

Works

 At the Feet of the Master (1910)
 The Kingdom of Happiness (1928)
 The Pool of Wisdom (1928)
 The First and Last Freedom (1954)
 Commentaries on Living (1956–1960)
 Freedom from the Known (1969)
 Krishnamurti's Notebook (1976)
 Krishnamurti's Journal (1982)
 Krishnamurti to Himself (1987)

Other
Tube & Berger - Imprint Of Pleasure (song): contains a Jiddu Krishnamurti talk extract.

References
Notes

Citations

Bibliography

External links

 
 J. Krishnamurti Online Official website — making available thousands of transcripts as well as many audio and video recordings. An international joint venture of the four Krishnamurti Foundations.
 Krishnamurti Foundation Trust – Established in 1968 as an educational charitable trust, the Foundation exists to preserve and make available the teachings of J. Krishnamurti.
 Krishnamurti and the Ojai Valley
 The Bohm-Krishnamurti Project: Exploring the Legacy of the David Bohm and Jiddu Krishnamurti Relationship
 The Krishnamurti Study Centre A retreat centre in England
 J Krishnamurti Study Centre in Hyderabad, India
 The Levin Interviews - Bernard Levin's interviews with Jiddu Krishnamurti 
 

 
Date of birth unknown
1986 deaths
20th-century Indian philosophers
Philosophers of love
Deaths from pancreatic cancer
Deaths from cancer in California
Krishnamurti, J.
Krishnamurti, J.
Telugu people
Former Theosophists
Krishnamurti, J.
Krishnamurti, J.
Founders of Indian schools and colleges
Founders of new religious movements
Religious writers
People from Rayalaseema
People from Chittoor district
1895 births
Indian spiritual teachers
20th-century Indian writers
Indian male writers
Writers from Andhra Pradesh